Franciszek Tim (4 June 1924 – 9 September 1986) was a Polish footballer. He played in one match for the Poland national football team in 1952.

References

External links
 

1924 births
1986 deaths
Polish footballers
Poland international footballers
Place of birth missing
Association footballers not categorized by position